Hu Hongwen (16 March 1925 – 19 May 2016) was a Chinese organic chemist, educator and an academician of the Chinese Academy of Sciences (CAS). He was known as the Chief editor of Chinese higher education textbook Organic Chemistry.

Hu died on 19 May 2016 at the age of 91 in Nanjing.

References

1925 births
2016 deaths
Chemists from Sichuan
Harbin Institute of Technology alumni
Members of the Chinese Academy of Sciences
Moscow State University alumni
Nanjing University alumni
Academic staff of Nanjing University
Organic chemists
People's Republic of China science writers
Writers from Guang'an